Oppressors–oppressed distinction or dominant–dominated opposition is a political concept. One of the first theorists to use it was Georg Wilhelm Friedrich Hegel, who wrote in his 1802 The German Constitution: "The Catholics had been in the position of oppressors, and the Protestants of the oppressed." Karl Marx made the concept very influential, and it is often considered a fundamental element of Marxist analysis. Some have judged it simplistic. Many authors have adapted it to other contexts, including Marx, Friedrich Engels,  Vladimir Lenin, Antonio Gramsci, Simone Weil, Paulo Freire, and others. It has been used in a variety of contexts, including discussions of the bourgeoisie and proletariat, imperialism, and self-determination.

Imperialism and self-determination 
The theory of oppressor and oppressed nations has been part of Vladimir Lenin's thought on imperialism, self-determination and criticisms of Social Democrats. Lenin wrote:

Criticism
The political philosopher Kenneth Minogue provides a criticism of the oppressors–oppressed distinction in his work The Pure Theory of Ideology.

References

Footnotes

Bibliography

 
 
 
 
 
 
 

1802 introductions
Political philosophy
Social concepts